This list comprises all players who have been placed on a regular-season roster for FC Gold Pride since the team's first Women's Professional Soccer season in 2009.  This list does not include pre-season training rosters, short-term players, or discovery players who do not appear for the club.

Key to positions

Players
 
Gold Pride players
Gold Pride
Association football player non-biographical articles
San Francisco-related lists
FC Gold Pride players